The 2012 Toledo Rockets football team represented the University of Toledo in the 2012 NCAA Division I FBS football season. They were led by head coach Matt Campbell in his first full year after coaching the Rockets in the 2011 Military Bowl. They played their home games at the Glass Bowl. They were a member of the West Division of the Mid-American Conference. They finished the season 9–4, 6–2 in MAC play to finish in a tie for second place in the West Division. They were invited to the Famous Idaho Potato Bowl where they lost to Utah State.

Schedule

Game summaries

@ Arizona

1st quarter scoring: ARIZ – J. Bonano 26-yard field goal

2nd quarter scoring: TOL – Alonzo Russell 59-yard pass from Terrance Owens (Jeremiah Detmer kick); ARIZ – A. Hill 30-yard pass from M. Scott (J. Bonano kick); TOL – David Fluellen 1-yard run (Detmer kick)

3rd quarter scoring: ARIZ – K. Carey 73-yard run (Bonano kick)
 
4th quarter scoring: TOL - Detmer 40-yard field goal

OT scoring: ARIZ – T. Miller 10-yard pass from Scott (Bonano kick)

@ Wyoming

Bowling Green

Coastal Carolina

@ Western Michigan

Central Michigan

@ Eastern Michigan

Cincinnati

Last meeting was in the 2001 Motor City Bowl.

@ Buffalo

Ball State

@ Northern Illinois

Akron

Utah State–Famous Idaho Potato Bowl

References

Toledo
Toledo Rockets football seasons
Toledo Rockets football